Vazhoor  is a town in Kottayam district in the state of Kerala, India.It is a village, panchayat and block with headquarters at Kodungoor on NH183. Basically an agrarian community inhabits this part, whose income depends on rubber cultivation

Demographics
 India census, Vazhoor had a population of 23982 with 11722 males and 12260 females.
The total geographical area of village is 2860 hectares.  There are about 6,110 houses in Vazhoor village.

 India census, Vazhoor had a population of 23909 with 11634 males and 12275 females.

Education
Vazhoor have a number of educational institutions. SVRNSS College is a Kerala Govt. aided college run by the Nair Service Society and it is affiliated to the Mahatma Gandhi University, Kottayam, Kerala. The college was started in 1965. 
The nearby campus includes the SVRNSS Higher secondary school and the SVRNSS primary school.
Government High School Kodungoor and Government LP school are located near the block headquarters at Kodungoor.

Vidyananda vidya bhavan is located near the town towards pala.

Medical
Thiruvalla Medical Mission Hospital, Kodungoor.
A Primary Health Centre, Govt veterinary & Govt. Homeo Dispensary are situated in the town.
A few ayurvedic clinics and an allopathic clinic are situated in Vazhoor.
There are also medical shops in Vazhoor.

Topography
Vazhoor also has a vital juncture connected by roadways at Kodungoor, to some major towns around in Kottayam.
National Highway NH 183 (also containing State Highway SH 13 (KK ROAD) passes through Vazhoor.

References

Villages in Kottayam district